Barskoye Pole is a rural locality (a village) in Yugskoye Rural Settlement, Cherepovetsky District, Vologda Oblast, Russia. The population was 20 as of 2002.

Geography 
Batransky is the nearest rural locality.

References 

Rural localities in Cherepovetsky District